George Blaine Schwabe (July 26, 1886 – April 2, 1952) was an American politician and a Republican U.S. Congressman from Oklahoma.

Biography
Schwabe was born in Arthur in Vernon County son of George Washington Schwabe and Emily Ellen (Mose) Schwabe. He attended public schools in his hometown. In 1910, he graduated from the law department at the University of Missouri. He was admitted to the bar the same year and began to practice law in Columbia, Missouri.

Career
In 1911, Schwabe moved to Nowata, Oklahoma, and began to practice law there. He successfully ran for mayor of Nowata and served in that capacity during 1913 and 1914. On June 10, 1914, he married Jeannette Eadie Simpson and they had five children. After Jeannette died in 1939, he married Barbara Yirsa McFarland on July 23, 1943.

He began his service in state government in 1918 when he represented Nowata County, Oklahoma, in the State House of Representatives. He served as House Speaker in 1921 and 1922. He was the last Republican to serve in this capacity until 2005 when Todd Hiett was elected (there have been eight Republicans to serve as Speaker of the Oklahoma House of Representatives).

Following his term in the State House, he moved to Tulsa, Oklahoma, and stepped away from public service while continuing to practice law. From 1928 to 1936, he was the chairman of the Republican county committee.

In 1944, he decided to return to politics when he successfully ran for Congress, representing Oklahoma's 1st congressional district. From January 3, 1945, to January 3, 1949, he served in the 79th and 80th United States Congress, losing to Dixie Gilmer in 1948. He was reelected in 1950 to serve in the 82nd United States Congress from January 3, 1951, until his death. During his time in office, he served on the Appropriations Committee.

Death
On April 2, 1952, while still in office, Schwabe died of a heart attack at age 65 years, 251 days, in Alexandria, Virginia. He is interred at Memorial Park Cemetery, Tulsa, Oklahoma.

See also
 List of United States Congress members who died in office (1950–99)

References

External links
George B. Schwabe Collection and Photograph Series at the Carl Albert Center

1886 births
1952 deaths
People from Vernon County, Missouri
University of Missouri alumni
Oklahoma lawyers
Politicians from Columbia, Missouri
Republican Party members of the United States House of Representatives from Oklahoma
People from Nowata, Oklahoma
20th-century American politicians
Speakers of the Oklahoma House of Representatives
20th-century American lawyers